Masters W50 discus world record progression is the progression of world record improvements of the discus W50 division of Masters athletics.  Records must be set in properly conducted, official competitions under the standing IAAF rules unless modified by World Masters Athletics.

The W50 division consists of female athletes who have reached the age of 50 but have not yet reached the age of 55, so exactly from their 50th birthday to the day before their 55th birthday. The W50 division throws exactly the same 1 kg implement as the Open division.

Key

References

Masters Athletics Discus list

Masters athletics world record progressions
Discus